Alpha 5 (α5), Alpha-5 (α-5) or Alpha Five may refer to:

Alpha 5 (Robert Silverberg anthology), a science fiction anthology edited by Robert Silverberg first published in 1974
Alpha 5 (Power Rangers), a fictional character from the Power Rangers franchise
Integrin alpha-5, a protein encoded by the ITGA5 gen in humans
Alpha-5 beta-1 (α5β1), an integrin that binds to matrix macromolecules and proteinases and thereby stimulates angiogenesis
Alpha 5 (Minolta) (α-5), an A-mount 35mm SLR by Minolta in 2001, also known as Dynax 5 / Maxxum 5 / Alpha Sweet II
Alpha-5 Digital (α-5D), an A-mount APS-C format DSLR by Konica Minolta in 2005, also known as Dynax 5D / Maxxum 5D / Alpha Sweet Digital (DG-5D)

Alpha V (αV) or Alpha-V (α-V) may refer to:

Integrin alpha-V, a protein encoded by the ITGAV gen in humans
Alpha-v beta-5 (αVβ5), an integrin that binds to matrix macromolecules and proteinases and thereby stimulates angiogenesis
Laminin, alpha 5, a protein that in humans is encoded by the LAMA5 gen

See also
 Sony Alpha NEX-5 (α NEX-5)
 A5 (disambiguation)
 Alpha (disambiguation)